Cissi Pera Klein (19 April 1929 in Narvik – 3 March 1943 in Auschwitz) was a Norwegian Jewish girl who is commemorated every year as one of the victims of the Holocaust in her home town in Trondheim. Her parents had emigrated to Norway from the Baltic states around 1905, at first living in North Norway, but then establishing a retail store in Trondheim. She was arrested at her school on 6 October 1942, detained, and ultimately deported with the transport ship Gotenland from Oslo to Stettin, from which she was sent by train to Auschwitz, where she was murdered the day she arrived, on 3 March 1943. She was 13 years old.

Cissi Klein became famous in her home town of Trondheim in the mid-1990s, when the city decided to appoint one of its 72 residents who were deported as a symbol for the persecution during the war. In 1995, the street where she lived was named Cissi Kleins gate, and a statue of her made by Tore Bjørn Skjølsvik and Tone Ek was unveiled in the park nearby in 1997. In memory of the day she was removed from her school by police, pupils from the Kalvskinnet Primary School visit the park on 6 October every year to lay flowers. The composer Ståle Kleiberg has written a musical piece in her memory.

Gallery

References

1929 births
1943 deaths
The Holocaust in Norway
Norwegian Jews who died in the Holocaust
People from Trondheim
People from Narvik
Norwegian civilians killed in World War II
Norwegian people who died in Auschwitz concentration camp
Children who died in Nazi concentration camps
Norwegian children
Jewish children who died in the Holocaust